James Fullarton Sloane (13 May 1866 – 1947) was a Scottish footballer who played in the Football League for Stoke.

Career
Sloane played for Rangers before moving south of the border to Stoke where he was a member of the club's first Football League squad. He played eleven matches in that inaugural league season scoring twice before returning to Rangers.

Career statistics

References

Scottish footballers
Rangers F.C. players
Stoke City F.C. players
English Football League players
1947 deaths
1866 births
Association football forwards